Kenneth George Budd (16 October 1925 – 21 January 1995) was an English mural artist, known for his mosaics and work in other materials. His company, Kenneth Budd and Associates was based in Penge, south London.

Budd was born in Fulham, London, and studied at Beckenham School of Art from 1941 to 1944, then at the Royal College of Art from 1947 to 1950. He first worked for the firm of William Mitchell & Partners of Forest Hill, London which produced public art in concrete.

He was made an Associate of the Royal College of Art in 1950. Budd was elected the Master of the Art Workers' Guild in 1992.

Later in his career, he worked with his son Oliver, who continues to make murals and has redone some of his father's work. In January 2015 Oliver Budd appeared in Episode 2 of the BBC mini-series Sacred Wonders of Britain discussing the Roman mosaics of Lullingstone Roman Villa.

Works 

Budd's works include:

Further reading

References

External links 

 Budd Mosaics
 1968 video of Budd working on the J.F. Kennedy memorial

1925 births
1995 deaths
Artists from London
Alumni of the Royal College of Art
English muralists
Mosaic artists
People from Fulham
People from Penge
20th-century English painters
English male painters
Associates of the Royal College of Art
Masters of the Art Worker's Guild
20th-century English male artists